Yarara, New South Wales is an historical rural locality in the Snowy Monaro Regional Council located at .

References

Localities in New South Wales
Snowy Monaro Regional Council